Rocky Comfort may refer to:

Rocky Comfort, Arkansas
Rocky Comfort, Missouri
Rocky Comfort Creek, a stream in Georgia